William Woodburn Skiles (December 11, 1849 – January 9, 1904) was an American lawyer and politician who served as a U.S. Representative from Ohio from 1901 to 1904.

W.W. Skiles is buried in Oakland  Cemetery in Shelby, Ohio.

Biography
Born in Stoughstown, Cumberland County, Pennsylvania, on December 11, 1849 to John Gettis Skiles (c1820-1891) and Sarah Jane Martin (1823-1913), both of Cumberland County, Pennsylvania.  His grandfather was William Martin.  Siblings of W. W. Skiles were Mary Caroline Cramer (1847-1920), George M. Skiles (1852-1916), John Clark Skiles (1855-1906), Jennie Smith (1857-1939), Valletta Bell (1861-1945), and Burgetta Crum (1863-1925).  Sarah Jane Martin had at least three sisters: Mary Hahn (-1867), Martha E. Mattoon (-1893), and Susan B. Roberts (1831-1910)

Skiles moved with his parents to Richland County, Ohio, in 1854 and attended the district schools in Shelby, Ohio.

He taught school for several years before graduating from Baldwin University in Berea, Ohio, in 1876.

In 1877, Skiles married E. Dora Matson of Shelby, and had two children.

He then studied law, was admitted to the bar on July 24, 1878, and commenced the practice of his profession in Shelby, Ohio in partnership with his brother as Skiles and Skiles.

He was interested as a stockholder and director in various manufacturing enterprises.
He served as president of the Citizens Bank from 1893 until his death.
He served as president and member of the Shelby City School Board 1885–1904.
He served as member of the Republican State central committee 1900–1904.

Congress
Skiles was elected as a Republican to the Fifty-seventh and Fifty-eighth Congresses and served from March 4, 1901, until his death in Shelby, Ohio, January 9, 1904.
He served as chairman of the Committee on Patents (Fifty-eighth Congress).

Congress 
He died January 9, 1904, and was interred in Oakland Cemetery.

See also
List of United States Congress members who died in office (1900–49)

References

1849 births
1904 deaths
Baldwin Wallace University alumni
People from Shelby, Ohio
19th-century American politicians
Republican Party members of the United States House of Representatives from Ohio